Graham Waterhouse is a cellist and contemporary composer who was born in London and resides in Germany. His compositions focus on chamber music. They have been performed and recorded internationally. As a cellist, he has written for his own instruments and other string instruments, but being the son of bassoonist William Waterhouse, he has also been familiar with double reed instruments, and several works were commissioned by the International Double Reed Society (IDRS), usually first performed at their annual conventions. He has run a series of chamber music concerts at the Gasteig in Munich, where several works received their premiere. His first notable composition, the first movement of his String Sextet, Op. 1, was written in 1979, and a duo for two violins, Fantasia Ucraina, in 2022.

Table of compositions 

His essential works, predominantly the published and recorded ones, are listed in the following table, initially by the year of composition. Other features listed are titles, Opus number, genre, publisher, year of publication, year of premiere, premiere location, recordings, and finally notes and a link to further information.

The years of composition follow those given on the composer's website. Works of the chamber music genre are further distinguished as solo, duo, trio, quartet, quintet, sextet, nonet and ensemble. The recordings list three portrait CDs, CD1 in 2001, CD2 in 2004, and CD3 in 2021. Additionally, some works have been recorded individually.

Waterhouse has had his works published by various publishing houses. Several of them are now represented by Schott Music (Schott), his principal publisher from 2019, including Accolade Musikverlag (Accolade), Robert Lienau Musikverlag (Lienau) and Zimmermann Musikverlag (Zimmermann). Works listed by Schott are marked by an S for further information. His first publisher was Friedrich Hofmeister Musikverlag, Leipzig (Hofmeister), marked by an F. Several works for speaking voice and cello were published by Heinrichshofen Verlag (Heinrichshofen), marked H. Breitkopf & Härtel (Breitkopf) have published pedagogic works, marked B.

Recording details 
Compositions by Waterhouse have been recorded on three portrait CDs and several other collections.

The first portrait CD, Graham Waterhouse, of chamber music for recorder, clarinet, cello and piano, was released by Cybele Records in 2001, containing:
 Praeludium 
 Three Pieces for Solo Cello
 Contraventings
 Le Charmeur de Serpents
 Scherzino
 bow'n blow 
 Vezza
 Gestural Variations
 Toccatina Precipitando

A second CD, Graham Waterhouse Portrait 2, was released by Meridian Records in 2004, dedicated to music for string orchestra and works for wind ensemble. It contains: 
 Chieftain's Salute
 Sinfonietta
 Mouvements d'Harmonie
 Celtic Voices
 Hymnus
 Hale Bopp
 Jig, Air and Reel

A third portrait CD, Graham Waterhouse Skylla und Charybdis, was released by Farao in 2021. The collection of chamber music for strings and piano includes:
 Rhapsodie Macabre
 Bei Nacht
 Trilogy
 Bells of Beyond
 Kolomyjka
 Skylla and Charybdis

References

External links 
 

Waterhouse
Compositions by Graham Waterhouse